GoodMorning.com (formerly Novosbed) is a Canadian eCommerce mattress and sleep product company. Their products are manufactured and sold in both the United States and Canada.

Sam Prochazka co-founded GoodMorning.com in 2009 to give consumers an alternative to what he refers to as "the ubiquitously pushy, deceptive, and expensive mattress buying experience".

History 
Headquartered in Edmonton, Alberta, Canada, the company was co-founded in 2009 by siblings Sam Prochazka, Andy Prochazka, and Helenka Prochazka under the name Novosbed. It was financed with $40,000 of personal investment. According to Fast Company, the company launched with the goal of selling quality mattresses without the traditional brick-and-mortar markup or the "annoying hassle of salespeople".

Novosbed originally manufactured its mattresses in China but moved production to the US in 2012 where US orders are now built in Pennsylvania. Novosbed mattresses sold in Canada are manufactured in the Toronto area. Novosbed has cited higher and more reliable quality and lower trade tariffs as primary motivations for the relocation of their manufacturing.

It has been described as a "retail disruptor" by the National Retail Federation due to its invention of the in-home sleep trial. The trial allows customers to purchase a mattress online and sleep on it for several months before committing to it financially. Any returned mattresses are recycled or donated to a charity in need through the company's donation program. According to CBC News, mattress-in-a-box companies with sleep trials "exploded" from a handful to more than 150 in the mid-2010s. Prochazka has said the at-home risk-free sleep trial is "what made beds in boxes go viral."

In 2017, the company began expanding its Canadian product catalogue to include additional foam and spring-hybrid mattress brands at a variety of price points.

In 2019, Novosbed changed its name to GoodMorning.com and launched a new website under the same name that houses its full mattress product line, as well as sleep accessories. A majority of GoodMorning.com's mattress brands continue to operate on their own transactional websites. GoodMorning.com mattress brands have grown to include Douglas, Novo, Juno, Cherry, Brunswick, Recore, Logan & Cove, and Apollo.

Donation Program 
The company's philanthropy dates back to 2010. In 2014, it was referred to as the "Warby Parker of mattresses" because of its in-home trial, its money-back guarantee, and the donation of returned mattresses to charities throughout North America. In a 2014 BBC News interview, the company's return rates were said to be 3%, substantially below the industry average of 10%.

In 2020, GoodMorning.com formed a charity partnership with the Make-A-Wish Foundation of Canada and donated $50,000 in new beds to children across Canada fighting critical illnesses during the COVID-19 pandemic.

References

External links
Novosbed website
GoodMorning.com website

Companies based in Edmonton
Retail companies established in 2009
Internet properties established in 2009
Online retailers of Canada
Mattress retailers of the United States